George Aldridge may refer to:

 George Aldridge (boxer) (born 1936), British middleweight boxer
 George Sydney Aldridge (1847–1911), Australian businessman, president of the Adelaide Stock Exchange
 George Washington Aldridge Sr. (1833–1877), New York politician
 George W. Aldridge (1856–1922), Republican politician from New York state